Kismet is a 1931 American drama film directed by William Dieterle and starring Gustav Fröhlich, Dita Parlo and Vladimir Sokoloff. It was produced as a German-language version of the 1930 Warner Brothers film Kismet.

Cast
 Gustav Fröhlich
 Dita Parlo 
 Vladimir Sokoloff 
 Anton Pointner 
 Karl Etlinger

References

Bibliography
 Waldman, Harry. Missing Reels: Lost Films of American and European Cinema. McFarland, 2000.

External links

1931 films
1931 drama films
American drama films
Warner Bros. films
1930s German-language films
Films directed by William Dieterle
American black-and-white films
1931 multilingual films
1930s American films